The Metro Gold Line is an under construction bus rapid transit line in Minnesota. The line will travel from downtown Saint Paul, Minnesota to the eastern terminus in Woodbury, Minnesota. The 10-mile line runs largely along I-94 in bus only lanes with stops at designated stations. The project was initially called the Gateway Corridor before being named a color to match the rest of the Metro system operated by Metro Transit. The project is expected to open in 2025.

History
Originally, the Gateway Corridor was planned to follow Interstate 94 from the St. Croix River Bridge in Wisconsin to Saint Paul and is one of the most heavily used and traveled corridors in the Twin Cities metropolitan area. As a result of recent population growth, the Gateway Corridor today moves more than 150,000 vehicles per day. In 2009, a commission was created to study and plan alternative transportation options in the corridor. 

In August 2010, the Gateway Corridor Commission and its consultant team initiated a Transit Alternatives Analysis Study (AA), looking at the corridor from the Twin Cities to Eau Claire, Wisconsin. This is the first step in determining the best mode (i.e. light rail, commuter rail or bus rapid transit); estimated ridership, possible routes and stops, and projected costs to build, operate and maintain. In looking at these four main areas, the study will help to address the issues of congestion, potential economic development/revitalization and environmental and social impacts.

The AA Study will take approximately 18 months to complete and is expected to be finished by spring 2012. Final decisions regarding the mode of transit and route will be determined by the Metropolitan Council and Ramsey and Washington County Regional Railroad Authorities. These decisions will help move this from a planning effort into a real, tangible project.

The Gateway Corridor Commission dropped the commuter rail option, leaving only possible bus rapid transit or light rail routes. All of the bus rapid transit route options would run on Interstate 94.

Bus Rapid Transit
The proposed bus rapid transit line would from downtown Saint Paul to Woodbury and was proposed to be built by 2024. The project was renamed from the Gateway Corridor to the METRO Gold Line The line would cost $485 million in 2021 dollars with 45% of that coming from federal sources. The Gateway Corridor Commission estimates 8,600 weekday riders by 2040. Buses would run 90% of the time on new roads that run next to existing roads and highways. Service would be every 10 minutes during peak times and 20 - 30 during other times. Travel times from end to end for the 12 stations would take at least 34 minutes. The Metropolitan Council approved the locally preferred alternative in December 2016. The project began New Starts Project Development in January 2018. After passing the National Environmental Policy Act with a Finding Of No Significant Impact from the FTA in January 2020, the Metropolitan Council declared no additional environmental review was needed for the project in March 2020.

The project was given a "medium-high" rating by the Federal Transit Administration in March 2021. The rating allows the project to continue into the engineering phase of the FTA's New Starts program. The "medium-high" rating was an improvement over the "medium-low" rating that the project received in January 2020. By adding 350 park-and-ride spaces, ridership projections increased which improved the project's rating. Utility work for the project could start as soon as the summer of 2021.

With 3 years needed until service could start, developments worth $200-290 million were proposed along the line by April 2021.

Buses will operate in bus only lanes for 70% of the 10 mile long project. Construction was officially kicked off on October 19, 2022. Construction is expected to be completed and service begin in 2025.

References

External links

The Gateway Corridor

Bus rapid transit in Minnesota
Proposed bus rapid transit in the United States
Proposed public transportation in Minnesota
Transportation in Saint Paul, Minnesota
Transportation in Wisconsin
Interstate 94
Metro Transit (Minnesota)